Odsey is a hamlet in Cambridgeshire close to the border with Hertfordshire and near the town of Baldock.  It contains a hotel and has a main-line railway station (Ashwell and Morden) which services the three closest villages: Ashwell, Steeple Morden and Guilden Morden, and offers direct train links to Cambridge and London Kings Cross.  It is situated in the parish of Steeple Morden.

The original "Hundred of Odsey" was named after the hamlet, and the area was important in the past as a stop on the Icknield Way.

External links

Hamlets in Cambridgeshire
South Cambridgeshire District